Capron is a French and English surname. Notable people with the surname include:
 
 Capron (Sussex cricketer) (18th century), English cricketer
 Allyn Capron (1846–1898), American army captain
 Allyn K. Capron (1871–1898), American army captain
 Brian Capron (born 1947), English actor
 Frederick Capron (1860–1942), English cricketer
 Hiram Capron (1796–1872), American-born founder of Paris, Ontario
 Jean Pierre Capron (1921–1997), French landscape and portrait artist
 John Capron (1797–1878), American army officer and politician
 John Rand Capron (1829–1888), English astronomer
 Ralph Capron (1889–1980), American baseball player
 Robert Capron (born 1998), American actor
 Roger Capron (1922–2006), French ceramic artist
 Victor Capron (1868–1934), American politician

See also

Places
 Capron, Illinois
 Capron, Oklahoma
 Capron, Virginia

Science, engineering and technology 
 The BASF trade name for nylon 6

English-language surnames
French-language surnames